This is a list of the winners and nominations of the Primetime Emmy Award for Outstanding Casting for a Limited or Anthology Series or Movie.

Chronology of category names

Winners and nominations

1980s

1990s

2000s

2010s

2020s

Programs with multiple wins

2 wins
 American Crime Story

Casting directors with multiple awards

3 awards
 Meg Liberman

2 awards
 Mary Colquhoun
 Ellen Lewis
 Cami Patton
 Courtney Bright
 David Rubin
 Kathleen Chopin
 Jackie Lind
 John Papsidera
 Laura Rosenthal
 Nicole Daniels
 Suzanne Smith

Programs with multiple nominations

4 nominations
 American Horror Story

3 nominations
 Fargo

2 nominations
 American Crime Story
 Sherlock

Casting directors with multiple nominations

7 nominations
 David Rubin

6 nominations
 Meagan Lewis
 Meg Liberman

5 nominations
 Eric Dawson
 Nina Gold
 Avy Kaufman
 Lynn Kressel 
 Cami Patton
 Robert J. Ulrich

4 nominations
 Kathleen Chopin
 Richard Hicks
 Ellen Lewis
 Jackie Lind
 Suzanne Smith
 Rachel Tenner

3 nominations
 Shay Bentley-Griffin
 Steve Brooksbank
 Jaki Brown-Karman
 Robin Cook
 Candice Elzinga
 Rhonda Fisekci
 Alexa L. Fogel
 Nancy Foy
 Tina Gerussi
 Stephanie Gorin
 Rene Haynes
 Billy Hopkins
 Kate Rhodes James
 Pat Moran
 John Papsidera
 Robi Reed
 Laura Rosenthal 
 Mary Jo Slater
 Bernard Telsey

2 nominations
 Juel Bestrop 
 Jo Edna Boldin
 Deirdre Bowen
 Courtney Bright
 Tiffany Little Canfield
 Di Carling
 Ellen Chenoweth
 Mary Colquhoun
 Carmen Cuba
 Nicole Daniels
 Leo Davis
 Susan Edelman
 Libby Goldstein
 Diane Heery
 Randi Hiller
 Lissy Holm
 Phyllis Huffman
 Irene Lamb
 Moonyeenn Lee
 Molly Lopata
 Junie Lowry-Johnson
 Linda Lowy
 Jeanne McCarthy
 Robyn M. Mitchell
 Beth Sepko
 Robert Sterne
 Juliet Taylor
 Angela Terry
 Victoria Thomas
 Jill Trevellick
 Gary M. Zuckerbrod

Total awards by network
 HBO – 21
 CBS / FX – 3 
 Netflix - 2 
 ABC / AMC / PBS / Showtime – 1

References

Casting for a Limited or Anthology Series or Movie
Casting awards